Ludmila Jandová (3 August 1938 – 20 October 2008) was a Czech painter and printmaker.

Born in Osík, Jandová studied first in Železný Brod at the glassmaking school. She graduated in 1969. During her career she produced graphic art of various types as well as illustrations, drawings, paintings, and pastels; at times she also worked in collage and other disciplines. Her work often depicted Christian subjects. She died after a long illness.

Three prints by Jandová are owned by the National Gallery of Art.

References

1938 births
2008 deaths
Czech women painters
Czech printmakers
Women printmakers
20th-century Czech painters
20th-century printmakers
20th-century Czech women artists
21st-century Czech painters
21st-century printmakers
21st-century Czech women artists
People from Svitavy District
Academy of Fine Arts, Prague alumni